This is a list of Slovenian mathematicians.

A 

 Anton Ambschel (1749–1821)

B 

 Iztok Banič
 Vladimir Batagelj (1948–)
 Andrej Bauer (1971–)
 Andrej Blejec (1953–)
 Marijan Blejec (1919–1992)
 Marko Boben (1973–)
 Ludvik Bogataj (1949–2009)
 Zvonimir Bohte (1935–)
 Janko Bračič
 Franc Breckerfeld (1681–1744)
 Matevž Bren (1954–)
 Boštjan Brešar
 Matej Brešar (1963–)
 Silvo Breskvar (1902–1969)
 Andrej Brodnik (1961–)

C 

 Anton Cedilnik
 Matija Cencelj
 Andrej Cergol (1595–1645)
 Miran Černe
 Jaka Cimprič
 Karin Cvetko Vah

D 
 France Dacar
 Mirko Dobovišek
 Tanja Dravec
 Barbara Drinovec Drnovšek
 Roman Drnovšek

F 
 Joannes Disma Floriantschitsch de Grienfeld (1691–1757)
 Franc Forstnerič (1958–)

G 

 Franc Galič (1929–1982)
 Josip Globevnik (1945–)
 Darja Govekar
 Josip Grasselli (1924–2016)
 Janko Gravner

H 

 Izidor Hafner
 Ferdinand Augustin Hallerstein (1703–1774)
 Herman of Carinthia (c. 1100–c. 1160) 
 Milan Hladnik
 Franc Hočevar (1853–1919)
 Bojan Hvala
 Dušan Hvalica

I 

 Stane Indihar

J 

 Rajko Jamnik (1924–1983)
 Fran Jeran (1881–1954)
 Martin Juvan

K 

 Milan Kac (1924–?)
 Sara Kališnik
 Sandi Klavžar (1962–)
 Igor Klep
 Marjeta Knez
 Andrej Kobav (1593–1654)
 Tomaž Košir
 Joahim Košutnik (1714–1789)
 Jernej Kozak (1946–)
 Edvard Kramar
 Marjeta Kramar Fijavž
 Josip Križan (1841–1921)
 France Križanič (1928–2002)
 Bogdan Krušič
 Igor Kukavica
 Klemen Kukec (?–1541)
 Karel Kunc (1879–1950)
 Ivan Kuščer (1918–2000)
 Klavdija Kutnar (1980–)

L 

 Ivo Lah (1896–1979)
 Vito Lampret
 Boris Lavrič
 Franc Lebedinec
 Peter Legiša (1950–)
 Gorazd Lešnjak

M 

 Bojan Magajna
 Joze Malešič
 Aleksander Malnič (1954–)
 Dragan Marušič (1953–)
 Miklavž Mastinšek
 Blaž Matek (1855–1910)
 Josip Mazi
 Pavlina Mizori–Oblak
 Štefan Močilnik (1928–1996)
 Franc Močnik (1814–1892)
 Bojan Mohar
 Ivan Molinaro (1903–1988)
 Nežka Mramor–Kosta
 Janez Mrčun

O 

 Polona Oblak
 Matjaz Omladič (1950–)
 Bojan Orel

P 

 Dušan Pagon (1955–)
 Bernard Pergerl (1440–1501)
 Andrej Perlah (1490–1551)
 Peter Petek (1944–)
 Iztok Peterin (1974–)
 Marko Petkovšek(1955–)
 Tomaž Pisanski (1949–)
 Josip Plemelj (1873–1967)
 Bor Plestenjak
 Primož Potočnik (1971–)
 Jože Povšič (1907–1985)
 Jasna Prezelj
 Andreja Prijatelj (1953–2002)
 Niko Prijatelj (1922–2003)
 Ivan Pucelj

R 

 Janez Rakovec
 Marko Razpet
 Dušan Repovš (1954–)
 Viljem Rupnik

S 

 Mateja Sajna
 Oton Sajovic (1907–1996)
 Pavle Saksida (1960–)
 Janez Krstnik Schoettl (1724–1777)
 Peter Šemrl
 Marjeta Škapin-Rugelj
 Tomislav Skubic (1930–1996)
 Marko Sodnig (1729–1800)
 Ivan Štalec (1910–1994)
 Jožef Stefan (1835–1893)
 Boštjan Steiner (1680–1748)
 Rok Strašek (1972–)
 Anton Suhadolc
 Irene Swanson

T 

 Karl Tirnberger (1731–1780)
 Gabrijel Tomšič
 Zvonko Trontelj
 Aleksej Turnšek

V 

 Alojzij Vadnal (1910–1987)
 Anton Vakselj (1899–1987)
 Aleš Vavpetič
 Jurij Vega (1754–1802)
 Aleksander Vesel
 Ivan Vidav (1918–2015)
 Jože Vrabec (1940–)
 Joso Vukman

Z 

 Emil Žagar
 Egon Zakrajšek (1941–2002)
 Borut Zalar
 Aleš Založnik
 Matjaz Željko
 Janez Žerovnik
 Boris Zgrablič
 Milan Ziegler
 Petra Žigert
 Arjana Žitnik
 Rihard Zupančič (1878–1949)

See also
Mathematician
Geometer
List of Slovenians

Mathematicians
Slovenian mathematicians
List